The 7th Writers Guild of America Awards honored the best film writers of 1954. Winners were announced in 1955.

Winners & Nominees

Film
Winners are listed first highlighted in boldface.

Special Awards

References

External links
WGA.org

1952
W
Writers Guild of America Awards
Writers Guild of America Awards